Oum Dreyga Airport  is an airport serving Oum Dreyga in Western Sahara.

See also
Transport in Western Sahara
List of airports in Western Sahara

References

 Google Earth

Airports in Western Sahara